A list of booksellers who predominantly sell new or used books online, although some may sell other items as well; some may also sell through brick and mortar stores. Incorporated is a list of online marketplaces to which numerous small independent booksellers belong.

AALBC.com, launched in 1998, focuses on books written by, or about, people of African descent
AbeBooks, online marketplace for used books, owned by Amazon.com since 2008  
Alibris an online marketplace for used but also new books
Amazon.com the "world's largest bookstore" began by selling books from its website in 1995, and is now the world's largest online retailer of consumer goods. It operates country-specific versions of its website for Australia, Brazil, Canada, China, France, Germany, India, Italy, Japan, Mexico, the Netherlands, Spain, Sweden, the United Arab Emirates, and the United Kingdom. It bought Bibliofind.com (Cambridge, Massachusetts) in 1999 and AbeBooks in 2008.
Angus & Robertson, a 130 year old Australian bookstore.
Barnes & Noble the largest retail bookstore chain in the United States, operating more than 600 brick and mortar stores throughout the 50 states. It began experimenting with selling books online as early as the late 1980s
Better World Books, based in the United States, selling used books, and also supporting literacy projects and the Internet Archive
Biblio.com an online marketplace catering to the book collector
BibliOZ The Book Search Wizard leading specialist Australasian search engine for out-of-print, used and hard-to-find books established in 1999 featuring millions of books listed from the inventory of thousands of booksellers worldwide 
Blackwell's is a UK bookseller with both online and brick and mortar stores.
Books A Million the second largest bookstore chain in the United States
Book Depository owned by amazon.com, offers free shipping for books to addresses worldwide
Book People is a discount bookseller based in Godalming, Surrey, United Kingdom. It also sells in workplaces and schools via a nationwide network of Book People Local distributors. 
BookFinder.com, a meta-search site (online marketplace) for books, acquired by AbeBooks in 2005, which in turn was acquired by Amazon.com in 2008.
Bookshop.org is an online book marketplace founded in January 2020. Its stated mission is "to financially support local, independent bookstores."
Booktopia is Australia's largest online bookstore. They have 128,000 in stock titles with 800,000 units ready to ship from their 100,000 sq ft distribution centre.
Borders Books and Music (defunct as of 2011) a chain of brick and mortar stores that began selling books online relatively late, in 2008, after ending a marketing alliance with Amazon
Chapters owned by Indigo after a takeover in 2001, Chapters is Canada's largest online and retail bookstore
Chegg.com is an online bookstore which rents and sells books in United States.
Dymocks is the online presence of the Dymocks chain, established in Australia in 1879.
Half.com is an online bookstore which sells second hand or used books in United States (defunct as of 10/31/17)
Adrian Harrington, rare and antiquarian books, based in the United Kingdom.
 Maremagnum is an Italian meta-search site offering over 10 million titles.
 Medimops is the sales site of Momox in Germany, with turnover of about €250m/year.
Powell's Books a chain of brick and mortar stores that also sells online, based out of Portland, Oregon
Rahva Raamat is the largest book retail and wholesale trade company in Estonia, which has a history of over hundred years.
Rare Book Hub, San Francisco based bookseller of rare and antique books
ThriftBooks, web-based used bookseller headquartered near Seattle, Washington
Waterstones is a UK bookseller with both online and brick and mortar stores.
World of Books, based in the United Kingdom, selling used books

References

Book selling websites
Lists of companies by industry
Lists of websites